Persema U-21, an acronym for Persatuan Sepak Bola Malang Under-21 is an Indonesian football club based in Malang. They play in the top division in Indonesian football, Indonesia Super League U-21.

Squad

Former player
  Reza Mustofa Ardiyansyah (promotion to main team)
  Syamsul Huda (promotion to main team)
  Joko Ribowo (promotion to main team)
  Fathur Rohman (promotion to main team)
  Moch. Fatchun Ni'ami (promotion to main team)

All time top scorer

Achievements & honors
Liga Indonesia U-23
Champions (1): 2007
Indonesia Super League U-21 
13th Place (5th Place Group 2) (1): 2010

See also 
 Persema Malang
 Indonesia Super League U-21

External links
 Pengcab PSSI Kota Malang Official Site 
 Profile at liga-indonesia.co.id

Football clubs in Indonesia
Persema Malang